Julian Willock is a British Virgin Islander politician who is serving as Speaker of House of Assembly of the British Virgin Islands.

References

Year of birth missing (living people)
Living people
Place of birth missing (living people)